A Man Called Destruction is a studio album by American pop rock musician Alex Chilton, released in 1995.

The album consisted of six songs written by Chilton, and six cover versions including Jan and Dean's "The New Girl in School", which had featured as the B-side to their "Dead Man's Curve" single.

"It's Your Funeral" is based on Frédéric Chopin's marche funèbre which became the 3rd movement of his Piano Sonata No. 2.

Title
Blues musician Howlin' Wolf employed a pianist named William "Destruction" Johnson in the late 1940s, and Chilton's title is a reference to him as well as a play on both the title of the Western film A Man Called Horse and the Biff Bang Pow! song "A Girl Called Destruction".

Track listing
"Sick and Tired" (Chris Kenner) – 3:04
"Devil Girl" (Alex Chilton) – 2:55
"Lies" (Keith Keller) – 4:01
"It's Your Funeral" (Chilton, Jim Spake) – 1:29
"What's Your Sign Girl" (Daniel Pearson, Anthony Sepe) – 4:37
"Il Ribelle" (Adriano Celentano) – 2:14
"You Don't Have to Go" (Jimmy Reed) – 4:26
"Boplexity" (Chilton) – 2:56
"The New Girl in School" (Brian Wilson, Bob Norberg, Roger Christian, Jan Berry) – 2:10
"You're Lookin' Good" (Chilton) – 2:54
"Don't Know Anymore" (Chilton) – 3:28
"Don't Stop" (Chilton) – 2:46

Personnel
Alex Chilton – guitar, vocals, harmonica on track 7
Ron Easley – bass guitar on tracks 1–6, 8–12, guitar on track 7, backing vocals on tracks 5–6, 9 & 12
Doug Garrison – drums on tracks 1–6, 10–11
Richard Dworkin – drums on tracks 7–9, 12
Bob Marbach – organ on tracks 2–3, 10–12
Al Gamble – organ on tracks 1–4, 10–11
Charles Hodges – organ on track 8
Jim Spake – horn arrangements, tenor saxophone on tracks 1–4, 10–11
Fred Ford – baritone saxophone on tracks 1–4, 10–11
Nokie Taylor – trumpet on tracks 1–4, 10–11
The Jackies – backing vocals on track 3
Recorded at Ardent Studios, Memphis, Tennessee
Recorded and mixed by Jeff Powell
Additional engineering by Jeffrey Reed
Assisted by Erik Flettrich and Mike Kennedy
Mastered by Larry Nix
Sleeve design by Jeff Kratschmer
Art direction by Claire Boger
Photography by Paula Burch

References

Alex Chilton albums
1995 albums
Covers albums
Ardent Records albums